George Brettingham Sowerby II (1812 – 26 July 1884) was a British naturalist, illustrator, and conchologist. Together with his father, George Brettingham Sowerby I, he published the Thesaurus Conchyliorum and other illustrated works on molluscs. He was an elected a Fellow of the Linnean Society on 7 May 1844. He was the father of George Brettingham Sowerby III, also a malacologist.

He died on 26 July 1884 and is buried on the west side of Highgate Cemetery with his father George Brettingham Sowerby I and sister Charlotte Caroline Sowerby.

See also
Sowerby family

References

 H. Crosse & P. Fischer, 1885. Nécrologie. Journal de Conchyliologie 33(1): 80. 
 K. v. W. Palmer, 1965. Who were the Sowerbys? American Malacological Union, Annual Reports for 1964: 5–6. 
 J. Collins, 1973. The Sowerby family. J. S.  London: Seaton & Co., 22 pp
 Petit R.E. (2009) George Brettingham Sowerby, I, II & III: their conchological publications and molluscan taxa. Zootaxa 2189: 1–218.

External links

 

1812 births
1884 deaths
British zoologists
Conchologists
Burials at Highgate Cemetery